The 1998 Mazar-i-Sharif massacre took place in Mazar-i-Sharif, Afghanistan in 1998, and involved between 10,000-20,000 victims massacred by the Taliban.

The massacre occurred in the August 1998 after the Final battle of Mazar-i-Sharif (1997–1998) in which the city fell to Taliban forces. After capturing the city Taliban forces perpetrated a massacre of members of the Shia Hazara group.

History
As the Taliban's forces entered the city, they launched a campaign of violence and brutality against the population. It is estimated that thousands of people, including civilians, soldiers, and prisoners of war, were killed during the massacre. The Taliban also systematically targeted ethnic Hazaras and Tajiks, who were seen as supporters of the Northern Alliance.

Reports from the time suggest that the Taliban carried out mass executions, buried people alive, and used tanks to crush people to death. They also targeted women, children, and the elderly. The brutality of the massacre shocked the international community and led to widespread condemnation.

The Mazar-i-Sharif massacre was one of the worst incidents in the Afghan Civil War, and it highlighted the need for an end to the conflict. The Taliban's actions were widely condemned by human rights organizations and governments around the world. The incident also contributed to the growing international pressure on the Taliban regime, which was eventually ousted from power following the 2001 US-led invasion of Afghanistan.

Mass graves of Hazaras killed during the massacre were later found in nearby Jaghalkani-i-Takhta Pul.

See also
List of massacres in Afghanistan

References

Massacres committed by the Taliban
Massacres in Afghanistan
History of Balkh Province
Massacres in 1998
Afghan Civil War (1996–2001)
1998 crimes in Afghanistan
1998 murders in Asia
1990s murders in Afghanistan

August 1998 crimes
August 1998 events in Asia
Persecution of Hazaras